George Washington Baumgardner (July 22, 1891 – December 13, 1970) was a Major League Baseball pitcher who played for the St. Louis Browns. His key pitch was the fastball.

References

External links

1891 births
1970 deaths
Baseball players from West Virginia
Little Rock Travelers players
Major League Baseball pitchers
People from Barboursville, West Virginia
St. Louis Browns players